TAS-108, also known as SR-16234, is a drug discovered by Masato Tanabe and under development by SRI International and Taiho Pharmaceutical. It is a steroid hormone that has shown signs of treating and preventing breast cancer, even in patients where tamoxifen has failed.

Development
Masato Tanabe's team at SRI has focused on the development of steroid hormones. A compound discovered in a previous SRI contract from the National Institutes of Health showed potential – it acted like "anti-estrogen" in the breasts and uterus but like normal estrogen elsewhere in the body, and was more "tissue-selective". A contract was proposed to Taiho Pharmaceutical in July 1996, and within six years and slightly under $3 million (an unusually short amount of time), two new drugs were discovered and tested on people (particularly people for which tamoxifen has failed): SR-16234 and SR-16287.

The first of those, SR-16234, also inhibited the growth of blood vessels angiogenesis and accelerated the death of cancer cells apoptosis and thus was particularly well suited to be an anti-cancer drug. As of August 2010, the drug had been through five Phase I and two Phase II studies, and Phase III studies are being planned.

See also
 Cytestrol acetate
 Fulvestrant
 ICI-164384

References

External links
 SR-16234 (TAS-108) - AdisInsight
 

Antiestrogens
Estranes
Experimental cancer drugs
SRI International
Taiho Pharmaceutical
Diethylamino compounds